Huang Guifen (born 20 August 1997) is a Chinese sprinter specialising in the 400 metres. She represented her country in the 4 × 400 metres relay at the 2015 World Championships.

International competitions

1Disqualified in the final

Personal bests
Outdoor
100 metres – 11.69 (+0.2 m/s, Pomona 2018)
200 metres – 23.07 (+0.4 m/s, Tianjin 2017)
400 metres – 53.10 (Guiyang 2017)

Indoor
200 metres – 24.17 (Beijing 2015)
400 metres – 55.20 (Xianlin 2017)

References

1997 births
Living people
Chinese male sprinters
Athletes (track and field) at the 2018 Asian Games
World Athletics Championships athletes for China
Asian Games medalists in athletics (track and field)
Asian Games silver medalists for China
Asian Games bronze medalists for China
Medalists at the 2018 Asian Games
People from Loudi
Runners from Hunan
Athletes (track and field) at the 2020 Summer Olympics
Olympic athletes of China
21st-century Chinese people